Patrick Grandperret (24 October 1946 – 9 March 2019) was a French film director, screenwriter and producer. His film Murderers was screened in the Un Certain Regard section at the 2006 Cannes Film Festival.

Filmography

References

External links

1946 births
2019 deaths
French film directors
French male screenwriters
French screenwriters
French film producers